El Perfecto Desconocido or "The Perfect Stranger" is a 2011 film that was directed by Toni Bestard and stars Colm Meaney as the main character Mark O'Reilly. The film was shot in Mallorca.

Plot 
The mysterious arrival of a foreigner (Mark O'Reilly) to a small village in Spain awakes the sudden interest from a diverse group of residents. The residents of the village appear unexpectedly in the stranger's life, believing that he's going to reopen an old shop. In contrast, the real intentions of the stranger are hidden behind an old Polaroid photo, which has led him to that place in search of answers.

Despite speaking no Spanish, O'Reilly befriends a young man from an overprotective family and a young woman who gets in frequent scrapes and is pursued by the police at one point.

References

External links
 

2011 films
Spanish comedy-drama films
2010s Spanish films